The Canadian Premier League (CPL) is the top-division Canadian men's professional soccer league. In the 2023 season, the league will consist of eight teams in eight stadiums. The CPL primarily uses multi-purpose stadiums.

Current stadiums

Former stadiums

Neutral site stadiums

See also

 List of soccer stadiums in Canada
 List of Major League Soccer stadiums
 List of Canadian Football League stadiums

References

 
Canadian Premier League
Canadian Premier League